Hotel New Netherland (later Hotel Netherland) was located at the northeast corner of Fifth Avenue and 59th Street, in Manhattan, New York City, New York, in what is now the Upper East Side Historic District. It contained the Sherry's restaurant from 1919 until its demolition in 1927.

History

Built in 1892-93 to a design by William H. Hume for William Waldorf Astor, its original lessee was Ferdinand P. Earle. The structure was among the first steel-framed buildings in the city and it enjoyed a reputation for being a very fashionable hotel and location in its day. It was classified as a luxury hotel, rather than one with apartment accommodations as it provided permanent accommodations to its residents, albeit without kitchens. Meals were served in the hotel's dining room, the Louis Sherry restaurant. Renamed the Hotel Netherland in 1908, the neo-Romanesque structure was razed in 1927, replaced by the Sherry Netherland Hotel.

References

External links

1893 establishments in New York (state)
1927 disestablishments in New York (state)
59th Street (Manhattan)
Astor family
Buildings and structures demolished in 1927
New Netherland
Demolished buildings and structures in Manhattan
Demolished hotels in New York City
Fifth Avenue
Former skyscrapers
New Netherland
Skyscraper hotels in Manhattan
Manger hotels